The 1872 United States presidential election in Iowa took place on November 5, 1872. All contemporary 37 states were part of the 1872 United States presidential election. The state voters chose 11 electors to the Electoral College, which selected the president and vice president.

Iowa was won by the Republican nominees, incumbent President Ulysses S. Grant of Illinois and his running mate Senator Henry Wilson of Massachusetts. Grant and Wilson defeated the Liberal Republican and Democratic nominees, former Congressman Horace Greeley of New York and his running mate former Senator and Governor Benjamin Gratz Brown of Missouri. 

Grant won the state by a margin of 23.08%.

Results

See also
 United States presidential elections in Iowa

Notes

References

Iowa
1872
1872 Iowa elections